James Armstrong Mackay (June 25, 1919 – July 2, 2004) was a U.S. Representative and lawyer from Georgia. MacKay was elected as a Democrat to the Eighty-ninth Congress. He was an unsuccessful candidate for reelection to the Ninetieth Congress in 1966. He died on July 2, 2004, in Chattanooga, Tennessee.

Early life and education
Mackay was born in Fairfield, Jefferson County, Alabama on June 25, 1919.

He graduated with an A.B. degree from Emory University, Atlanta, Ga., in 1940, where he was a member of the Kappa Alpha Order. Mackay attended Duke University from 1940 to 1941. After active duty, he then returned to Emory where he was president of the student body and received an LL.B. in 1947.

Military service
During World War II, he served as a Coast Guard Reserve officer on the USS Menges, a destroyer escort in the Mediterranean, in 1944, and earned a Bronze Star Medal for rescuing men when his ship was torpedoed.

Service in U. S. Congress
During his tenure, he supported passage of the Medicare Program, and obtained federal funding for the Fernbank Science Center and Planetarium. He was also one of only two congressmen from Georgia (the other being Charles Weltner of the 5th district) to support the passing of the Voting Rights Act of 1965 into law.

MacKay was an unsuccessful candidate for reelection to the Ninetieth Congress in 1966.

Life in Decatur, Georgia
MacKay practiced law in Decatur, Georgia with his daughter Kathy and remained active in the Georgia Conservancy. He was a lifelong Methodist and served as an Emory trustee

MacKay was one of 32 state House members who opposed the Georgia flag change in 1956. "There was only one reason for putting the flag on there. Like the gun rack in the back of a pickup truck, it telegraphs a message," he said decades later. On Feb. 13, 1956, the day Governor Griffin approved the new flag with its Confederate emblem, the state Senate gave final legislative approval to a resolution declaring null and void the U.S. Supreme Court's decision in Brown vs. Board of Education.

Emory University conferred an Honorary Doctorate Degree on MacKay at its Sesquicentennial Convocation December 10, 1986. The honors included the Georgia Conservancy’s "Distinguished Conservationist Award," the DeKalb Historical Society’s "History Maker Award," the 1979 Rock Howard Award, and the 1984 "Mr. DeKalb" Award.

Founder of the Georgia Conservancy
Georgia Conservancy president John Sibley remarked after MacKay's passing, "He was a larger-than-life person and an environmentalist who raised the level of the environmental movement in Georgia all by himself." MacKay recognized that public concern for the environment, stemming from the 1962 publication of Rachel Carson’s Silent Spring, needed to take root in Georgia. In January 1967, he assembled some of his colleagues to discuss forming the group that today is known as one of the leading environmental organizations in the nation.

Under MacKay’s leadership, the Conservancy understood that seeing what was happening in Georgia is the best way to learn about places and issues, that being active rather than reactive leads to success, and that Georgia’s economy and ecology are inseparable. The Georgia Conservancy honored Jamie with its Distinguished Conservationist award in 2001. Sweetwater Creek, Panola Mountain, the Okefenokee Swamp, Chattooga River, Cumberland Island, and Fernbank are only a few of his legacies.

Death and legacy
MacKay died on July 2, 2004 at the age of 85, at Lookout Mountain, Tennessee where he maintained a boat cleat on his deck a thousand feet above the floor of Lookout Valley and invited others to join his Society of Noah – keeping the long view clearly in mind.

His first wife, Mary Caroline Lee MacKay, and his son, James Edward MacKay, predeceased him. He was survived by his wife Sara Lee MacKay, and his daughter Kathleen MacKay, of Rising Fawn, Georgia, a former member of the DeKalb Bar Association. MacKay's remains were cremated.

References
Notes

Sources
http://www.emory.edu/EMORY_MAGAZINE/summer99/who_runs_georgia.html
Georgia State University Library Special Collections and Archives: Georgia Government Documentation Project
http://boards.historychannel.com/thread.jspa?threadID=10762
http://www.georgiaencyclopedia.org/nge/Article.jsp?id=h-1010

External links

1919 births
2004 deaths
20th-century American lawyers
Emory University alumni
Emory University School of Law alumni
Democratic Party members of the United States House of Representatives from Georgia (U.S. state)
United States Coast Guard officers
Duke University alumni
20th-century American politicians